Pat Cash defeated Henrik Sundström in the final, 6–4, 6–7(5–7), 6–3 to win the boys' singles tennis title at the 1982 Wimbledon Championships.

Seeds

  Pat Cash (champion)
  Henrik Sundström (final)
  Eric Wilborts (second round)
  Loïc Courteau (semifinals)
  Guy Forget (quarterfinals)
  Michael Kures (first round)
  Jonathan Canter (third round)
  Tarik Benhabiles (quarterfinals)

Draw

Finals

Top half

Section 1

Section 2

Bottom half

Section 3

Section 4

References

External links

Boys' Singles
Wimbledon Championship by year – Boys' singles